The Architecture of Buffalo, New York, particularly the buildings constructed between the American Civil War and the Great Depression, is said to have created a new, distinctly American form of architecture and to have influenced design throughout the world.

History
Buffalo's original plan from the early 19th century was loosely based on Pierre Charles L'Enfant's 1791 plan for Washington, an Americanized version of Paris's system of radiating boulevards.  Buffalo's radial street grid was designed by Joseph Ellicott and complemented by a system of parks and parkways designed by Frederick Law Olmsted. Buffalo was the first city for which Olmsted designed an interconnected park and parkway system rather than stand-alone parks.

During the Centennial Exposition of 1876 in Philadelphia, Pennsylvania, Frederick Law Olmsted declared Buffalo to be "the best planned city, as to its streets, public places, and grounds, in the United States, if not in the world."

According to The New York Times architecture writer Nicolai Ourousoff:

Buffalo was founded on a rich tradition of architectural experimentation. The architects who worked here were among the first to break with European traditions to create an aesthetic of their own, rooted in American ideals about individualism, commerce and social mobility.

The city contains buildings designed by American architecture masters like Frank Lloyd Wright, Louis Sullivan, and H.H. Richardson, making Buffalo one of the most architecturally significant cities in America. It also contains many buildings designed by modern architects including Minoru Yamasaki, Toshiko Mori, Marcel Breuer and Harrison & Abramovitz.

Tallest buildings

Notable architects
Numerous architects and landscape architects have constructed landmark buildings and park systems of varying styles in Buffalo. They include: 

Max Abramovitz
Dankmar Adler
Charles N. Agree
Frederick C. Backus
Milton Earl Beebe
Louise Blanchard Bethune
Alfred Bossom
Gordon Bunshaft
Daniel Burnham
John E. Brent
Robert T. Coles
Marcel Breuer
Carrère and Hastings
George Cary (architect)
Joseph Ellicott
Cyrus L. W. Eidlitz
James A. Johnson
Esenwein & Johnson
Philip M. Jullien
E.B. Green
Alfred T. Fellheimer
Gwathmey Siegel & Associates Architects
Wallace Harrison
Albert Kahn
Edward Austin Kent
Kohn Pedersen Fox
Lockwood, Greene & Co.
Lord & Burnham
Duane Lyman
George Washington Maher
McKim, Mead & White
George Jacob Metzger
Toshiko Mori
Robert North
Frederick Law Olmsted
George B. Post
Cyrus Kinne Porter
Cornelius Ward Rapp
George Leslie Rapp
H.H. Richardson
Paul Marvin Rudolph
Eliel Saarinen
Eero Saarinen
Ellen Biddle Shipman
Joseph Lyman Silsbee
Edward Durell Stone
Louis Sullivan
Skidmore, Owings & Merrill
Max Toltz
Richard Upjohn
Calvert Vaux
Stanford White
Frank Lloyd Wright
Minoru Yamasaki

Landmarks, monuments and public places

Albright–Knox Art Gallery

The Albright–Knox Art Gallery was designed in 1890 architect Edward Brodhead Green and funded by Buffalo entrepreneur and philanthropist, John J. Albright, a wealthy Buffalo industrialist. It was originally intended to be used as the Fine Arts Pavilion for the Pan-American Exposition in 1901, but delays in its construction caused it to remain uncompleted until 1905. In 1962, a new addition was made to the gallery through the contributions of Seymour H. Knox, Jr. and his family, and many other donors. At this time the museum was renamed the Albright–Knox Art Gallery. The new building was designed by Skidmore, Owings and Merrill architect Gordon Bunshaft, who is noted for the Lever House in New York City. The Albright–Knox Art Gallery is listed in the National Register of Historic Places.

Buffalo Central Terminal

The Buffalo Central Terminal is a 17-story Art Deco style station designed by architects Fellheimer & Wagner and built in 1929 for the New York Central Railroad. The terminal "was built to handle over 200 trains and 10,000 passengers daily, as well as 1,500 New York Central employees. It included shops, a restaurant, soda fountain, parking garage and all other services required for daily passenger operations." It was added to the National Register of Historic Places on September 7, 1984.

Buffalo City Court Building

The Buffalo City Court Building is named Frank A. Sedita City Court (for Buffalo mayor Frank A. Sedita), and designed by Pfohl, Roberts and Biggie. It is a 10-story court house built in 1974 and located in Niagara Square and adjacent to Buffalo City Hall. The structure is a classic example of Brutalist architecture; its façade is dominated by large Precast concrete panels with narrow windows. The design was conceived with limited windows in order to keep the courtrooms and judges' chambers free from outside distraction.

Buffalo City Hall

Buffalo City Hall is a 32-story Art Deco building and was completed in 1931 by Dietel, Wade & Jones. Its walls are faced with Ohio sandstone and gray Minnesota limestone, above a base of gray granite. The exterior and interior are adorned with symbolic figures and decorations representing Buffalo's history, including the Iroquois Indians, the steel industry, law and education, electrical energy, and the waterfront community. In the lobby, there are four statues, "each which represent the characteristic of good citizenship, Virtue, Diligence, Service, and Fidelity." It was added to the National Register of Historic Places on January 15, 1999.

Buffalo History Museum

 The Buffalo History Museum was constructed in 1901 as the New York State pavilion for the Pan-American Exposition of 1901 and is the sole surviving permanent structure from the exposition. It was added to the National Register of Historic Places on April 23, 1980, and designated a National Historic Landmark on February 27, 1987.

Buffalo Main Light

The Buffalo Main Light, also known as The Buffalo Lighthouse, is Buffalo's oldest building. It was built in 1833 and deactivated in 1914. It appears on the city seal at the mouth of the Buffalo River. It is also one of the oldest lighthouses on the Great Lakes. The walls of the tapered, unpainted octagonal limestone tower are four feet thick at the base and rise to 44 feet in height. The foundation material was stone molehead and the lighthouse was constructed out of limestone and cast iron. The lens installed in 1857 was a third order Fresnel lens. It was listed on the National Register of Historic Places in 1984.

Delaware Park System

 The Delaware Park System is a historic park system and national historic district located in the northern and western sections of Buffalo.  The park system was designed by Frederick Law Olmsted and Calvert Vaux and developed between 1868 and 1876. The Park System comprises many parks, Delaware Park being the largest (encompassing 376 acres).  There are also Gates Circle, Chapin Parkway, Soldier's Place, Lincoln Parkway, Bidwell Parkway, and Front Park, among others. The park system was listed on the National Register of Historic Places in 1982.

Larkin Administration Building

 The Larkin Administration Building was Frank Lloyd Wright's first commission in Buffalo. Larkin executive Darwin D. Martin hired Wright to design a building that would house the large number of clerks needed to operate the mail-order business for the Larkin Soap Company.  Because the building would be located in an industrial part of town, it was necessary to make the building as attractive as possible to women, who made up the bulk of the white collar work force.

The Larkin building was Wright's first commercial commission and he designed not just the building, but also the furniture, light fixtures and the china for the workers' cafeteria. Where possible, files and furniture were built into the structure, and he created desks with attached chairs that could swivel to save room. Wright included a pipe organ for lunchtime entertainment, a lending library and a conservatory to allow employees to rest and commune with nature.  The Larkin Administration Building is significant for its comprehensive design, where every element performed a specific task, as well as being the first modern office building that separated blue-collar and white-collar workers.

The Larkin Company went out of business in 1937, and the building was sold.  Eventually, the City of Buffalo took it over for back taxes planning to demolish it for a trucking plaza.  Despite community outcry, the building was torn down in 1950.

Old Post Office

 The Old Post Office is a historic post office building located at 121 Ellicott Street in Buffalo in Erie County, New York. It was designed by the then Office of the Supervising Architect, Jeremiah O'Rourke, when construction started in 1897. The $1.5 million building opened in 1901 during the tenure of James Knox Taylor and operated as Buffalo's central post office until 1963 and was the tallest building in the city from 1901 to 1912.  The highly ornamented Gothic Revival style four-story building features a 244-foot tower over the central entrance and a roofed courtyard.  It was subsequently occupied by federal offices. Since 1981, it has been home to the city campus of Erie Community College.  Its tower is 74.4 meters tall.

Prudential (Guaranty) Building

The Prudential (Guaranty) Building was completed in 1896 and was designed by Chicago architect's Louis Sullivan and Dankmar Adler. It remains one of the first skyscrapers ever built with a steel structure and is embellished with terra cotta blocks. It was added to the National Register of Historic Places on March 20, 1973, and designated a National Historic Landmark on May 15, 1975.

Richardson Olmsted Complex

 The Richardson Olmsted Complex is a grouping of Medina red sandstone and brick hospital buildings designed in 1870 in the Kirkbride Plan by architect Henry Hobson Richardson with grounds by landscape architect Frederick Law Olmsted. The complex was the largest commission of Richardson's career and marks the beginning of his characteristic "Romanesque Revival" style known as "Richardsonian Romanesque." It was added to the National Register of Historic Places on January 12, 1973, and designated a National Historic Landmark on June 24, 1986.

Sculptures and monuments
 There are several sculptures and monuments located throughout the city, including:

Michelangelo's David by Angelus and Sons (founder)
Soldiers and Sailors Monument (Civil War Monument) by Caspar Bubert (Sculptor), George W. Keller (Architect), M.J. Powers (Founder)
McKinley Monument by Alexander Phimister Proctor (Sculptor), Newman & Evans (Sculptor), Carrère and Hastings (Architect)
Wolfgang A. Mozart by Olin H. Warner (Sculptor), Bureau Brothers Foundry (Founder)
Alexander Petofi (Sandor Petofi) by Geza Kende (Sculptor; Original Bust), Gabriella F. Koszorus-Varsa (Sculptor; New Bust), Frank A. Spangenberg (Sculptor; Base)
John F. Kennedy bust by Bryant Baker
Giuseppe Verdi by Antonio Ugo (Sculptor), A. Decianno (Sculptor)
Frederic Chopin by Jozef Mazur
Frank X. Schwab by C. Sorgi
Indian Hunter by John Quincy Adams Ward
General Daniel Davidson Bidwell by Sahl Swarz
Commodore Oliver Hazard Perry by Charles Henry Niehaus

Residential

Birge-Horton House

The Birge-Horton House was designed in 1895 by the Buffalo architectural firm of Green and Wicks and is a Georgian Revival style row house in "The Midway" section of Delaware Avenue. It is a four-story brick house with stone trim. The house is situated within the boundaries of the Allentown Historic District.  The Birge-Horton House was the last of the thirteen luxury row houses built from 1893–1895. All were four-story houses, and each house is the work of varying architects and of different designs; however, they give an overall appearance of unified composition because of similarities in height, width, and construction materials.

Charles W. Goodyear House

The Charles W. Goodyear House was designed by Buffalo architect Edward Green, of the Buffalo architecture firm Green & Wicks, and was completed in 1903 at a cost of $500,000. The home was built for Charles and Ella Goodyear. The house is located in the Delaware Avenue Historic District, a federally designated historic district listed on the National Register of Historic Places since 1974. The exterior of the -story house is brick trimmed with stone. The mansard roof includes a row of dormers with pedimented tops with a festooned motif that runs along the roofline above a dentilled cornice. The principal entrance is on the north (right) side of the house denoted by a large arched doorway, bordered on each side by stone urns. The east façade facing Delaware Avenue has a one-story porch with columns, that was later bricked in.

Darwin D. Martin House

The Darwin D. Martin House was designed by Frank Lloyd Wright and built between 1903 and 1905 for Darwin D. Martin, an executive of the Larkin Soap Company. Martin chose Wright to design his own house because he was so impressed with Wright and his design for the Larkin Administration Building.  The Martin House is considered to be one of the most important projects from Wright's Prairie School era. Compared to other Prairie Houses, the Martin House is unusually large and has an open plan containing 15 distinctive patterns of nearly 400 art glass windows, designed by Wright, some of which contain over 750 individual pieces of iridescent glass, that act as light screens to connect exterior views to the spaces within. More patterns of art glass were designed for the house than for any other of Wright's Prairie Houses.  It was added to the National Register of Historic Places on February 24, 1986, and designated a National Historic Landmark, also on February 24, 1986.

Theodore Roosevelt Inaugural National Historic Site

The Theodore Roosevelt Inaugural National Historic Site, also known as the Ansley Wilcox House, at 641 Delaware Avenue was built in 1840 by George Cary (U.S. Army) originally intended as the Barrack's officer's quarters. After the post was disbanded in 1845, the home reverted to a private residence.  Subsequent owners continued to modify the structure adding and demolishing out structures and additions.  In the late 19th century, Dexter Rumsey gave the property to his son-in-law Ansley Wilcox and his wife Mary Grace Rumsey.  The newest inhabitants made extensive renovations to the structure.

In 1901, while attending the Pan-American Exposition, anarchist Leon Czolgosz shot President William McKinley. Vice-President Theodore Roosevelt rushed back to Buffalo, but arrived only after McKinley had died.  Due to the tragic and politically charged circumstances of the President's death, the inauguration was held immediately, and the most appropriate site was determined to be the Wilcox home.  Approximately 50 dignitaries, family members and cabinet officials gathered in the front library for the inauguration and Federal Judge John R. Hazel administered the oath.  The Wilcoxes continued to live in the home until their deaths in the 1930s. The National Historic Site was authorized on November 2, 1966.  As a historic area administered by the National Park Service, it was automatically listed on the National Register of Historic Places the same day.

William Dorsheimer House

The William Dorsheimer House was designed and built in 1868 by Henry Hobson Richardson (1838–1886) for William Dorsheimer (1832–1888), a prominent local lawyer and Lieutenant Governor of New York. It is located on Delaware Avenue in Buffalo and is a -story brick dwelling. It represents the profound influence of French ideas on the arts in the post Civil War period.  It was listed on the National Register of Historic Places in 1980.

William R. Heath House

The William R. Heath House was designed by Frank Lloyd Wright, built in 1904–1905, and is located at 76 Soldiers Place in Buffalo, New York. It is built in the Prairie School architectural style.  William Heath was a lawyer who served as office manager, and eventually vice-president, of the Larkin Company in Buffalo. Heath's wife Mary was a sister of Elbert Hubbard, a former Larkin executive.  The property was a deep and narrow corner lot, facing a large traffic circle. This presented Wright with the problem of situating a substantial Prairie house, with its characteristically open structure, in a confined space with twice the street exposure.  The house was placed with its long axis right up against the Bird Ave. sidewalk with sections of the traffic circle acting as the grounds that a house of this standing would normally possess.

Gallery

Timeline of notable buildings
Before 1900:
1833 Buffalo Main Light
1840 Ansley Wilcox House, George Cary
1849-1851 St. Paul's Cathedral, Richard Upjohn
1868 William Dorsheimer House, Henry Hobson Richardson
1870 Richardson Olmsted Complex, Henry Hobson Richardson and Frederick Law Olmsted
1871 Delaware Avenue Methodist Episcopal Church, John Selkirk; 2000-2006, renovation to Babeville Flynn Battaglia
1871 County and City Hall, Andrew Warner
1882 Metcalfe House, McKim, Mead & White (Demolished, 1980)
1889 St. Louis Roman Catholic Church, Schikel and Ditmar
1890-1893 Erie County Savings Bank, George B. Post (Demolished, 1968)
1890-1905 Albright–Knox Art Gallery, Edward Brodhead Green; 1962 Skidmore, Owings and Merrill architect Gordon Bunshaft
1894 Twentieth Century Club, Green & Wicks
1894 Robert Root House, Stanford White of McKim, Mead & White (Demolished, 1935)
1895 Birge-Horton House, Green and Wicks
1895-1896 Williams-Pratt House, Stanford White of McKim, Mead & White
1896 Prudential (Guaranty) Building, Louis Sullivan and Dankmar Adler
1896 Ellicott Square Building, Daniel Burnham
1896-1898 Williams-Butler House/Jacobs Executive Development Center, Stanford White of McKim, Mead & White
1897 Old Post Office, Office of the Supervising Architect during the tenure of Jeremiah O'Rourke
1900-1920:
1900 Buffalo and Erie County Botanical Gardens, Lord & Burnham
1901 Buffalo Savings Bank, Green & Wicks
1901 Buffalo History Museum, George Cary
1901 Temple of Music, Esenwein & Johnson (Demolished, 1902)
1901-1902 YMCA Central Building or Olympic Towers, Green & Wicks
1902-1911 Hotel Lafayette, Bethune, Bethune & Fuchs; 1916–1917 and 1924–1926 additions, Esenwein & Johnson
1903 Charles W. Goodyear House, Edward Brodhead Green 
1903-1904 George Barton House, Frank Lloyd Wright
1903-1905 Darwin D. Martin House, Frank Lloyd Wright
1903-1906 Larkin Administration Building, Frank Lloyd Wright (Demolished, 1950)
1904-1905 William R. Heath House, Frank Lloyd Wright 
1906 The Calumet, Esenwein & Johnson
1908 Walter V. Davidson House, Frank Lloyd Wright
1911-1912 Larkin Terminal Warehouse, Lockwood, Greene & Co.
1912 City Honors School or Fosdick-Masten Park High School, Esenwein & Johnson
1912 Electric Tower, Esenwein & Johnson and E.B. Green and Sons
1912 Harlow C. Curtiss Building, Paul F. Mann
1913 The Marin, Green & Wicks
1914-1915 South Park High School, Edward Brodhead Green
1915 Concrete-Central Elevator, H.R. Wait and Monarch Engineering Co.
1920-1939:
1922 Saturn Club, Bley & Lyman
1923 Hotel Statler or Statler City, George B. Post & Sons
1924 M. Wile and Company Factory Building, Esenwein & Johnson
1925 Cargill Pool Elevator, C. D. Howe and Monarch Engineering Co.
1925 Liberty Building, Alfred C. Bossom; 1961 addition Lyman & Associates
1926 Shea's Performing Arts Center, Rapp and Rapp
1926 The Huyler Building, Harvey Starin Horton
1929 Buffalo Central Terminal, Fellheimer & Wagner
1929 Buffalo Museum of Science, Esenwein & Johnson
1929 Rand Building, James W. Kideney & Associates; Franklyn and William Kidd
1931 Buffalo City Hall, Dietel, Wade & Jones
1934 Edwin M. and Emily S. Johnston House, Bley & Lyman
1936 Michael J. Dillon Memorial United States Courthouse, E.B. Green and Sons and Bley & Lyman
1938 Erie County Holding Center, Green & James
1938-1940 Kleinhans Music Hall, Eliel Saarinen and Eero Saarinen
1939-1940 Buffalo Memorial Auditorium, Green & James
1940 to the present:
1964-1966 One M&T Plaza, Minoru Yamasaki and Lyman Associates
1969 Main Place Tower, Harrison & Abramovitz
1969-1972 One Seneca Tower, Skidmore, Owings & Merrill
1973 The Avant; 2009 renovation, Stieglitz Snyder Architecture
1974 Buffalo City Court Building, Pfohl, Roberts and Biggie
1987 Sahlen Field, HOK Sport
1990 50 Fountain Plaza, Brisbin Brook Beynon Architects
2004 Blue Sky Mausoleum, Anthony Puttnam of Taliesin Associated Architects from Frank Lloyd Wright design, 1935
2007-2011 Robert H. Jackson United States Courthouse, Kohn Pedersen Fox
2009 Eleanor and Wilson Greatbatch Pavilion, Toshiko Mori
2012 Gates Vascular Institute, Mehrdad Yazdani of CannonDesign
2014-2015 Delaware North Building, Diamond and Schmitt Architects

Styles and schools
 Buffalo architects used many design styles and belonged to a variety of architectural schools. Below is a sample of some of the styles and schools and schools found in Buffalo architecture:

Art Deco
Art Nouveau
Brutalism
Châteauesque
Federal Style
Gothic Revival
Greek Revival
Italianate
Second Empire
Sullivanesque
Victorian
Queen Anne

See also
Buffalo, New York
National Register of Historic Places listings in Buffalo, New York
List of National Historic Landmarks in New York
List of tallest buildings in Buffalo

References

External links
Built in Buffalo: How to Research Local Architecture, a page of online and offline sources for documenting houses, factories, churches and other Buffalo buildings
Buffalo Architecture and History, a comprehensive website documenting many of Buffalo's historical structures.
Buffalo Architectural Plans and Drawings, a guide to surviving architectural plans and drawings for Buffalo houses and buildings of all kinds.
Major Architectural History Sources, a guide to researching a Buffalo building by the Buffalo History Museum

 
Culture of Buffalo, New York
Buffalo
Buildings and structures in Buffalo, New York